Philip Kingsland Crowe (January 7, 1908 – November 16, 1976) was an American journalist, writer, intelligence officer and career diplomat.

Career 
Crowe was a journalist at the New York Evening Post, traveled in French Indochina and ran big game hunt before working on ads in the magazines Life and Fortune. During World War II, he worked in the Office of Strategic Services where he was the secret intelligence officer in charge of an area, covering China, Burma and India.

Diplomat 
He joined the U.S. Foreign Service in 1948. Crowe was U.S. Ambassador to Ceylon from 1953 to 1958 and in South Africa from 1959 to 1961. In 1969 he was appointed Ambassador to Norway and served until August 31, 1973. Following the ambassador period in Norway, Crowe was ambassador in Denmark from 1973 to 1975.

Author 
He published several books on outdoor recreation, ethic conservation and his time as a diplomat.

Awards 
 Bronze star, the Order of Yun-Hui from the Republic of China
 Grand Cross, Order of St. Olav from Norway
 Officer in the French Legion of Honor from France

References 

1908 births
1976 deaths
Writers from New York City
American newspaper journalists
Ambassadors of the United States to Sri Lanka
Ambassadors of the United States to South Africa
Ambassadors of the United States to Norway
Ambassadors of the United States to Denmark
Chevaliers of the Légion d'honneur
United States Foreign Service personnel
20th-century American diplomats